Nemuro Strait, also called Notsuke Strait and Kunashirsky Strait, is a strait, located at , separating Kunashir Island of the Kuril Islands, Russia (claimed by Japan) from the Shiretoko Peninsula, Hokkaidō, Japan. The strait connects the Sea of Okhotsk in the north to the Izmeny Strait (пролив Измены) in the south. It is located on the southeastern borders of Sakhalin Oblast, Russia, and Nemuro Subprefecture of Japan. Along the strait runs the border between the two states.

The Japanese towns of Rausu and Shibetsu overlook the strait.

External links 
 Shiretoko Peninsula at the NASA Earth Observatory

References

Straits of Japan
Straits of the Kuril Islands
International straits
Japan–Russia border
Japan–Soviet Union relations
Landforms of Hokkaido
Straits of the Pacific Ocean